Cascade County may refer to:

Cascade County, Montana
Cascade County, Washington (proposed new county)